Scotchtown Cemetery is a historic vernacular rural cemetery located near Erin in Chemung County, New York.  The cemetery includes a variety of monuments dating from the cemetery's founding in about 1880 to the present, with the majority before about 1950.  Prior to 1880, the land was a burial ground for the local Presbyterian church.

It was listed on the National Register of Historic Places in 2009.

References

External links
 

Cemeteries on the National Register of Historic Places in New York (state)
1880 establishments in New York (state)
Protestant Reformed cemeteries
Cemeteries in Chemung County, New York
National Register of Historic Places in Chemung County, New York